The Chipaque Formation (K2cp, Kc) is a geological formation of the Altiplano Cundiboyacense, Eastern Ranges of the Colombian Andes. The formation is also described as Gachetá Formation, named after Gachetá, in the area of the Llanos foothills of the Eastern Ranges. The formation, rich in TOC, is an important oil and gas generating unit for the giant oilfields Cupiagua and Cusiana of the Eastern Ranges as well as in the Llanos Orientales.

Etymology 
The formation was named in 1931 as group and as formation in 1957 by Hubach after Chipaque, Cundinamarca.

Description

Lithologies 
The Chipaque Formation contains a high density of fauna. The formation is rich in TOC and one of the principal source rocks for oil and gas generation in the foothills of the Eastern Ranges, sourcing fields as Cusiana, Cupiagua and many others. Chipaque also sourced the oilfields of the Llanos Orientales. In the Chitasugá-1 well, drilled between 1980 and 1981, from the sandstones of the Chipaque Formation half a million m³ of water were produced. The sandstone beds are reservoir rocks for oil in the Eastern Ranges.

Stratigraphy and depositional environment 
The Chipaque Formation overlies the Une Formation and is overlain by the Guadalupe Group. The core of the Zipaquirá Anticline consists of the Chipaque Formation. The age has been estimated to be Cenomanian-Turonian. Stratigraphically, the formation is time equivalent with the Simijaca Formation. The formation has been deposited in an open to shallow marine platform setting. The deposition is represented by a maximum flooding surface and anoxic conditions.

Outcrops 

The Chipaque Formation is apart from its type locality, found in the Eastern Hills of Bogotá, the Ocetá Páramo and many other locations in the Eastern Ranges. The anticlinals of the Río Blanco-Machetá, San José and Sopó-Sesquilé are composed of the Chipaque Formation.

Regional correlations

Gallery

See also 

 Geology of the Eastern Hills
 Geology of the Ocetá Páramo
 Geology of the Altiplano Cundiboyacense
 Petroleum industry in Colombia

Notes and references

Notes

References

Bibliography

Reports

Maps

External links 

 

Geologic formations of Colombia
Cretaceous Colombia
Upper Cretaceous Series of South America
Cenomanian Stage
Turonian Stage
Shale formations
Open marine deposits
Shallow marine deposits
Source rock formations
Mining in Colombia
Formations
Formations
Formations
Formations
Muysccubun